Beňuš is a village and municipality in Brezno District, in the Banská Bystrica Region of central Slovakia.

History
In historical records, the village was first mentioned in 1380 (Beneshawa) as a mining village, in 1563 it is mentioned as a free woodmen's village. In the 14th century, some Germans established here (from I. Lasslob "Deutsche Ortsnamen in der Slowakei"). In 1563 it belonged to Banská Bystrica’s Mining Chamber.

Genealogical resources

The records for genealogical research are available at the state archive "Statny Archiv in Banska Bystrica, Slovakia"

 Roman Catholic church records (births/marriages/deaths): 1656–1896 (parish A)

See also
 List of municipalities and towns in Slovakia

References

External links
https://web.archive.org/web/20070427022352/http://www.statistics.sk/mosmis/eng/run.html
http://benus.host.sk/
http://benus.sk 
Surnames of living people in Benus

Villages and municipalities in Brezno District